Mario Gerardo Piattini Velthuis (Buenos Aires, Argentina March 28, 1966). He is a computer scientist with diverse research in the field of systems and software engineering, founder of the Alarcos Research Group.

Biography 
Piattini was born as the first child of three brothers, in Buenos Aires (Argentina) whose parents are Carlos Piattini and Ans Velthuis. He later moved to Rome (Italy) and studied at the Liceo Cervantes Secondary School in Rome, where he finished in 1983.

In 1989, he finished his bachelor's degree in Computer Science at the Polytechnic University of Madrid, where he obtained his PhD in Computer Science in 1994. After working in several companies and being associate professor at the Complutense University, and at the Universidad Carlos III (UC3M) in Madrid, in 1997 he joined the university of Castilla la Mancha (UCLM). The same year he founded and managed Alarcos Research Group. Additionally, since 2002, he works as a professor of the UCLM University in the fields of Languages and Computer Systems.

In 2008, he was among the fifteen best researchers in the world in the field of systems and software engineering in the independent study Top scholars, in the area of systems and software engineering (2004-2008).

In 2010, he received the Award "Gabriel Alonso de Herrera" for his research career (2010), awarded by the Regional Government of Castilla-La Mancha.

In 2012, he received the National Award to the Professional Career of the Computer Engineer (2012). Federation of Associations of Computer Engineers of Spain.

In 2016, he received the Spanish National Award on Computing Science 'ARITMEL' 2016, for having made outstanding scientific contributions in the area of computer engineering.

He has worked as a consultant in the Ministry of Industry and Energy, and in the Ministry of Public Administration.

Career

Research 
His career began in the field of the database design and advanced databases, and later, in the field of the quality of information systems, where he has led and participated in various research projects. He is the director and founder of the Alarcos Research Group, specialized in the quality of information systems.

He has been Director of the Joint Research and Development Center UCLM-INDRA and the Institute of Technologies and Information Systems (ITSI) of the University of Castilla-La Mancha. Coordinator of the Area of Computer Science and Information Technology of the National Agency for Evaluation and Forecasting (ANEP)

University Management 
In the field of university management, he held various positions at the local level. In the University of Ciudad Real (UCLM) he was the Director of the Departmental Section of Computer Science.

At the University of Castilla-La Mancha, he served as deputy director of the Department of Computer Science between 2000 and 2005. In addition to this, he worked as an employer, between 2003 and 2011, of the Ínsula Barataria Foundation for the promotion of the Knowledge Society. 
In 2005, he founded the UCLM-INDRA Joint Research and Development Center, where he was director until 2010, and meanwhile, he founded the Institute of Technologies and Information Systems (ITSI) of the University of Castilla-La Mancha, where he was director until 2015.

Publications 
Mario Piattini has published several articles in international academic journals, delivered several papers at international conferences, and published a large number of books related to Software Engineering, Databases, Quality, and Audit of information systems.

References

External links 
 Mario Piattini interview by ComputerWorld in February 2018.
 Mario Piattini interview by ABC magazine after the global cyberattack of the WannaCry virus in May 2017.
 Piattini Mario, Digital Bibliography & Library Project 
 Mario Piattini, Google Scholars
 Mario Piattini, Directorio U.C.L.M.

1966 births
Living people